The Walhalla Graded School, built in 1901, is an historic building located at 101 E. North Broad Street in Walhalla, South Carolina. It was designed by noted Columbia architect William Augustus Edwards of the firm of Edwards and Walter and built by Grandy & Jordan of Greenville.

On February 13, 1992, it was added to the National Register of Historic Places. At the time of registration the building housed district offices for the School District of Oconee County.  It is currently used as the  Walhalla Civic Auditorium

See also
List of Registered Historic Places in South Carolina

References

External links 
 South Carolina Department of Archives and History file on Walhalla Graded School

School buildings on the National Register of Historic Places in South Carolina
William Augustus Edwards buildings
Schools in Oconee County, South Carolina
National Register of Historic Places in Oconee County, South Carolina